Aleksei Baiov (February 8, 1871 – May 8, 1935) was an Imperial Russian division, corps and army commander. He was born in present-day Ukraine. He was made a Poruchik in 1894, a Stabskapitän in 1896, a Podpolkovnik (lieutenant colonel) in 1900, a Polkovnik (colonel) in 1905 and a major general in 1911. After the October Revolution, he briefly sided with the Bolsheviks before turning against them.

Awards
Order of Saint Stanislaus (House of Romanov), 3rd class, 1898
Order of Saint Anna, 3rd class, 1905
Order of Saint Stanislaus (House of Romanov), 2nd class, 1908
Order of Saint Vladimir, 3rd class, 1912
Order of Saint Vladimir, 3rd class with swords (November 19, 1914)
Order of Saint Stanislaus (House of Romanov), 1st class (November 19, 1914)
Gold Sword for Bravery (Saint George Sword) (February 24, 1915)
The highest gratitude "for writings incurred the Tsar approved the Commission on organization of the celebration of 200 anniversary of victory of the Gangut" (March 16, 1915)
Order of Saint Anna, 1st class (March 20, 1915)
Order of Saint George, 4th degree (September 9, 1915)

Works
Leib-guards Jäger Regiment. Historical reminder for lower ranks. 1893
Memo on tactics for non-commissioned officers Corps.
Checklist for topographies for non-commissioned officers Corps.
Military-geographical and statistical description of northern Korea. 1903
Orders for Munnich 1736 – 1738 years. 1904
The Russian army during the reign of IMP. Anna Ioannovna. The war of Russia with Turkey in 1736–1739, t. 1–2, St. Petersburg. 1906; Tom. 1. volume 2.
A history of Russian martial art, 1–7, St. Petersburg. 1909-13:
History of the Russian army, 1, St. 1912;
History of martial arts as science, St. Petersburg. 1912
Russia's contribution to the victory of the allies. 1924
The origins of the great world of drama and its directors. 1927

Bibliography
 Незабытые могилы. Русское зарубежье: некрологи 1917–1999.// В 6 т. 8 книгах, под ред. В. Н. Чувакова. М. «Пашков Дом». 1999. т.1. «А-В». стр. 176.

Sources
 Р. Абисогомян. Приложение к магистерск. диссертации Р.Абисогомяна «Роль русских военных деятелей в общественно и культурной жизни в Эстонской Республике в 1920—1930 гг. и их литературное наследие. Биографический справочник». Тарту. 2007.
 Эстонский сайт георгиевских кавалеров

1871 births
1935 deaths
People from Uman
Russian military personnel of World War I
White Russian emigrants to Estonia
Recipients of the Order of Saint Stanislaus (Russian), 3rd class
Recipients of the Order of St. Anna, 3rd class
Recipients of the Order of Saint Stanislaus (Russian), 2nd class
Recipients of the Order of St. Vladimir, 3rd class
Recipients of the Order of Saint Stanislaus (Russian), 1st class
Recipients of the Gold Sword for Bravery
Recipients of the Order of St. Anna, 1st class